In computer science, a jump search or block search refers to a search algorithm for ordered lists. It works by first checking all items Lkm, where  and m is the block size, until an item is found that is larger than the search key. To find the exact position of the search key in the list a linear search is performed on the sublist L[(k-1)m, km].

This is better than a linear search, but worse than a binary search. The advantage over the latter is that a jump search only needs to jump backwards once, while a binary can jump backwards up to log n times. This can be important if a jumping backwards takes significantly more time than jumping forward.

The algorithm can be modified by performing multiple levels of jump search on the sublists, before finally performing the linear search. For an k-level jump search the optimum block size ml for the l th level (counting from 1) is n(k-l)/k. The modified algorithm will perform k backward jumps and runs in O(kn1/(k+1)) time.

Implementation
 algorithm JumpSearch is
     input: An ordered list L, its length n and a search key s.
     output: The position of s in L, or nothing if s is not in L.
     
     a ← 0
     b ← ⌊√n⌋
     
     while Lmin(b,n)-1 < s do
         a ← b
         b ← b + ⌊√n⌋
         if a ≥ n then
             return nothing
     
     while La < s do
         a ← a + 1
         if a = min(b, n)
             return nothing
     
     if La = s then
         return a
     else
         return nothing

See also
 Skip list
 Interpolation search
 Linear search - runs in O(n) time, only looks forward
 Binary search - runs in O(log n) time, looks both forward and backward

References
 
 Ben Shneiderman, Jump Searching: A Fast Sequential Search Technique, CACM, 21(10):831-834, October 1978.

Search algorithms